Tai Shi-Yan (born 1951) is a retired Taiwanese hurdler.

He won the bronze medal in the 400 metres hurdles at the 1973 Asian Championships, and then the gold medal in both 400 and 110 metres hurdles at the 1975 Asian Championships.

References

1951 births
Living people
Taiwanese male hurdlers